Alboin (530s–572) was the King of Lombards from about 560 until 572.

Alboin may also refer to:
Alboin of Spoleto, Lombard Duke of Spoleto from 757 to 758
Alboin, a character in The Lost Road by J.R.R. Tolkien

See also 
Albion (disambiguation)
Alboino I della Scala (c. 1284–1311), seignor of Verona
Paolo Alboino della Scala (1343–1375), also seignor of Verona